Malèna is a 2000 erotic comedy-drama film written and directed by Giuseppe Tornatore from a story by Luciano Vincenzoni. It stars Monica Bellucci and Giuseppe Sulfaro. The film won the Grand Prix at the 2001 Cabourg Film Festival. At the 73rd Academy Awards, the film was nominated for Best Cinematography and Best Original Score.

Plot
On June 10, 1940, in the small Sicilian town of Castelcuto, a teenage boy named Renato experiences three major events: Italy enters World War II; he receives a new bike; and he first sees the beautiful and sensual Malèna, who is the most desired young woman in town. Her husband is in the armed forces fighting the British in Africa, and she lives alone. Because of her beauty and solitary status, she is an object of lust for all the town's men and of hatred for its women. She keeps an eye on her infirm old father who lives alone, until he gets an anonymous note slandering her,  which causes him to reject her.

Renato becomes obsessed with Malèna, spying on her in her house and stalking her when she leaves it. To fuel his erotic fantasies, he steals some of her underwear from her clothes line. When his parents find it in his bedroom, they become upset and try to break his fixation.

Malèna gets the news that her husband is killed, adding grief to her isolation. Rumours grow around her, which she unwisely fuels by allowing an unmarried air force officer to visit her after dark. When she is denounced and put on trial, the officer sends testimony that he was nothing more than an occasional friend. The betrayal hurts, but Malèna says nothing to condemn him. After her acquittal, her advocate pays her a visit and rapes her.

Renato decides to be Malèna's protector, asking God and his saints to watch over her and performing little acts of vengeance against her detractors. He does not realise that his views of her are little better than those of the townspeople, and has no idea how Malèna herself feels.

Meanwhile, the war reaches Sicily and the town is bombed by the Allies, killing her father. Now penniless and universally scorned, with nobody willing to give her work, she sinks into prostitution. The townsfolk are happy to see her as a whore rather than a dangerous widow. When Nazi forces occupy the town and Renato encounters his idol with two German soldiers, he faints. His mother decides it is demonic possession, taking him to a priest for exorcism, but his more practical father takes the lad to the town brothel. There he fantasises that the prostitute initiating him is Malèna.

The Germans leave, and American troops enter the town, welcomed by ecstatic cheers. The women storm the hotel and drag out Malèna, ripping off her clothes, beating her and cutting off her hair. To escape further persecution, she leaves the hostile town. A few days later, her husband Nino, who has survived as a prisoner of war but lost an arm, comes back looking for her. His house has been taken over by displaced people and nobody wants to tell him how to find his wife. Renato leaves him an anonymous note saying that she still loves him but has suffered misfortunes and gone to the city of Messina.

A year later, Nino and Malèna return and are seen strolling through the town. Women notice she now looks more matronly and plain. Even if she is still beautiful, since she is now married and living with her husband, they realize that she is no longer a threat. So people begin speaking of her with more respect. When she goes to the market, the women who beat her say good morning and call her madam. Walking home, some fruit falls from her bag and Renato rushes to pick it up. He wishes her good luck and she gives him an enigmatic half-smile, the only time either has ever spoken to or looked openly at the other.

The aged Renato reflects that he has known and loved many women and has forgotten all of them. The only one he can never forget is Malèna.

Cast
 Monica Bellucci as Maddalena "Malèna" Bonsignore Scordìa
 Giuseppe Sulfaro as Renato Amoroso
 Luciano Federico as Renato's father
 Matilde Piana as Renato's mother
 Pietro Notarianni as Bonsignore, the teacher
 Gaetano Aronica as Antonino "Nino" Scordìa
 Gilberto Idonea as Centorbi, the advocate
 Angelo Pellegrino as the Fascist party boss

Music

The soundtrack was nominated for an Academy Award for Best Original Score and a Golden Globe Award for Best Original Score.

Critical reception
The film has a 54% rating on Rotten Tomatoes, based on reviews by 78 critics, with an average of 5.6/10. The website's critics consensus reads, "Malena ends up objectifying the character of the movie's title. Also, the young boy's emotional investment with Malena is never convincing, as she doesn't feel like a three-dimensional person." On Metacritic, which uses a weighted score, the film is rated 54/100, based on 22 critics, indicating "mixed or average reviews".

When first released, Variety wrote: "Considerably scaled down in scope and size from his English-language existential epic, The Legend of 1900, Giuseppe Tornatore's Malena is a beautifully crafted but slight period drama that chronicles a 13-year-old boy's obsession with a small-town siren in World War II Sicily. Combining a coming-of-age story with the sad odyssey of a woman punished for her beauty, the film ultimately has too little depth, subtlety, thematic consequence or contemporary relevance to make it a strong contender for arthouse crossover. But its erotic elements and nostalgic evocation of the same vanished Italy that made international hits of Cinema Paradiso and Il Postino could supply commercial leverage."

Film critic Roger Ebert compared the film to Federico Fellini's work, writing: "Fellini's films often involve adolescents inflamed by women who embody their carnal desires (e.g. Amarcord and 8½). But Fellini sees the humor that underlies sexual obsession, except (usually but not always) in the eyes of the participants. Malena is a simpler story, in which a young man grows up transfixed by a woman and essentially marries himself to the idea of her. It doesn't help that the movie's action grows steadily gloomier, leading to a public humiliation that seems wildly out of scale with what has gone before and to an ending that is intended to move us much more deeply, alas, than it can."

Awards and nominations

References

External links
 
 
 
 
 

2000 films
2000s Italian-language films
2000s Italian films
2000s American films
2000 romantic comedy-drama films
2000s coming-of-age comedy-drama films
2000s erotic drama films
Italian coming-of-age comedy-drama films
Italian erotic drama films
Italian romantic comedy-drama films
Italian World War II films
Italian-language American films
American coming-of-age comedy-drama films
American erotic drama films
American romantic comedy-drama films
American World War II films
Erotic romance films
Films about prostitution in Italy
Films about puberty
Crimes against sex workers in fiction
Films directed by Giuseppe Tornatore
Films produced by Harvey Weinstein
Films with screenplays by Luciano Vincenzoni
Films scored by Ennio Morricone
Films set in 1940
Films set in 1941
Films set in Sicily
Films shot in Italy
Films shot in Morocco
Miramax films